Negative-bias temperature instability (NBTI) is a key reliability issue in MOSFETs, a type of transistor aging. NBTI manifests as an increase in the threshold voltage and consequent decrease in drain current and transconductance of a MOSFET. The degradation is often approximated by a power-law dependence on time. It is of immediate concern in p-channel MOS devices (pMOS), since they almost always operate with negative gate-to-source voltage; however, the very same mechanism also affects nMOS transistors when biased in the accumulation regime, i.e. with a negative bias applied to the gate.

More specifically, over time positive charges become trapped at the oxide-semiconductor boundary underneath the gate of a MOSFET.  These positive charges partially cancel the negative gate voltage without contributing to conduction through the channel as electron holes in the semiconductor are supposed to.  When the gate voltage is removed, the trapped charges dissipate over a time scale of milliseconds to hours.  The problem has become more acute as transistors have shrunk, as there is less averaging of the effect over a large gate area.  Thus, different transistors experience different amounts of NBTI, defeating standard circuit design techniques for tolerating manufacturing variability which depend on the close matching of adjacent transistors.

NBTI has become significant for portable electronics because it interacts badly with two common power-saving techniques: reduced operating voltages and clock gating.  With lower operating voltages, the NBTI-induced threshold voltage change is a larger fraction of the logic voltage and disrupts operations.  When a clock is gated off, transistors stop switching and NBTI effects accumulate much more rapidly.  When the clock is re-enabled, the transistor thresholds have changed and the circuit may not operate.  Some low-power designs switch to a low-frequency clock rather than stopping completely in order to mitigate NBTI effects.

Physics 
The details of the mechanisms of NBTI have been debated, but two effects are believed to contribute: trapping of positively charged holes, and generation of interface states. 

 preexisting traps located in the bulk of the dielectric are filled with holes coming from the channel of pMOS. Those traps can be emptied when the stress voltage is removed, so that the Vth degradation can be recovered over time.
 interface traps are generated, and these interface states become positively charged when the pMOS device is biased in the "on" state, i.e. with negative gate voltage.  Some interface states may become deactivated when the stress is removed, so that the Vth degradation can be recovered over time. 

The existence of two coexisting mechanisms has resulted in scientific controversy over the relative importance of each component, and over the mechanism of generation and recovery of interface states. 

In sub-micrometer devices nitrogen is incorporated into the silicon gate oxide to reduce the gate leakage current density and prevent boron penetration. It is known that incorporating nitrogen enhances NBTI. For new technologies (45 nm and shorter nominal channel lengths), high-κ metal gate stacks are used as an alternative to improve the gate current density for a given equivalent oxide thickness (EOT). Even with the introduction of new materials like hafnium oxide in the gate stack, NBTI remains and is often exacerbated by additional charge trapping in the high-κ layer.

With the introduction of high κ metal gates, a new degradation mechanism has become more important, referred to as PBTI (for positive bias temperature instabilities), which affects nMOS transistor when positively biased. In this case, no interface states are generated and 100% of the Vth degradation may be recovered.

See also
 Hot carrier injection
 Electromigration

References

J.H. Stathis,  S. Mahapatra, and T. Grasser, “Controversial issues in negative bias temperature instability”, Microelectronics Reliability, vol 81, pp. 244-251, Feb. 2018.  
T. Grasser et al., “The paradigm shift in understanding the bias temperature instability: From reaction–diffusion to switching oxide traps”, IEEE Transactions on Electron Devices 58 (11), pp. 3652-3666, Nov. 2011.   
D.K. Schroder, “Negative bias temperature instability: What do we understand?”, Microelectronics Reliability, vol. 47, no. 6, pp. 841–852, June 2007. 

JH Stathis and S Zafar, “The negative bias temperature instability in MOS devices: A review”, Microelectronics Reliability, vol 46, no. 2, pp. 278-286, Feb. 2006. 
M. Alam and S. Mahapatra, “A comprehensive model of PMOS NBTI degradation”, Microelectronics Reliability, vol. 45, no. 1, pp. 71–81, Jan. 2005. 

Semiconductor device defects
Semiconductor device fabrication
Electronic engineering
Hardware testing